Alfred Schwarzenbach (born 8 October 1941) is a Swiss equestrian. He competed in two events at the 1972 Summer Olympics.

References

1941 births
Living people
Swiss male equestrians
Olympic equestrians of Switzerland
Equestrians at the 1972 Summer Olympics
Place of birth missing (living people)
20th-century Swiss people